Buchwaldoboletus xylophilus is a species of bolete fungus in the family Boletaceae native to Asia, found on wood. It has a convex brown cap, and a red-brown stipe. Its edibility is unknown.

Taxonomy and naming 
Originally described by Thomas Petch in 1922 as Boletus xylophilus, it was given its current name by Ernst Both and Beatriz Ortiz-Santana in A preliminary survey of the genus Buchwaldoboletus, published in „Bulletin of the Buffalo Society of Natural Sciences” in 2011.

Description 
The cap is convex, and its surface is dry to subviscid, and "minutely velvety". Its color is ferrugineous brown. Easily peeled off the mushroom, the soft brown skin is separated from the flesh by a thin gelatinous layer. The pores are small and angular, and the pore surface stains blue with injury. The stipe is red-brown, and there is a yellow mycelium at the stipe base.

Spores are ellipsoid, smooth, and measure 4.5–5.5 by 3.2–4 µm.

Distribution 
Buchwaldoboletus xylophilus has been recorded across Asia throughout Malaysia, Sri Lanka, Hong Kong, and Philippines

References

External links 

 

Boletaceae
Fungi described in 1922
Fungi of Asia